Rhynchopelta is a genus of sea snails, marine gastropod mollusks in the family Peltospiridae.

Species
Species within the genus Rhynchopelta include:
 Rhynchopelta concentrica McLean, 1989
Species brought into synonymy
 Rhynchopelta nux Okutani, Fujikura & Sasaki, 1993: synonym of Lepetodrilus nux (Okutani, Fujikura & Sasaki, 1993)

References

Peltospiridae
Monotypic gastropod genera